Kung, the Assassin of a Thousand Claws is a fictional character appearing in DC Comics publications and related media, commonly as a recurring foil of the superhero Wonder Woman. A Japanese-American mercenary with the magical ability to transform into animals, he first appeared in 1977's Wonder Woman #237, written by Gerry Conway and illustrated by José Delbo. He would reappear several years later in both All-Star Squadron and Who's Who in the DC Universe, as well as in Crisis on Infinite Earths, the 1985 company-wide publication event that rebooted DC Comics' continuity. After the Crisis on Infinite Earths, Wonder Woman and her supporting characters and foes were re-imagined. Though originally absent from this revised mythos, Kung was reintroduced for the Modern Age in 1998's Guns of the Dragon, a four-issue DC Comics limited series by Tim Truman. An updated version of the character, a shape-shifting martial arts master, would emerge to once again confront Wonder Woman in 2007's Wonder Woman (vol. 3) Annual #1, written by Allan Heinberg and illustrated by Terry Dodson and Rachel Dodson.

Fictional character biography

Thomas Morita
The early life of Thomas Morita was fraught with difficulty. His parents immigrated to the United States from Japan before the Great Depression. During the Depression, his father was unable to find work and eventually died. His mother died soon afterward, leaving only Thomas and his sister, Nancy. Morita traveled to his parents' homeland to train as a samurai and learning of the Japanese-American internment only further fueled his hatred of America. At some point during his training, he underwent some unexplained mystical process that imbued him with the power to transform into animals.

Kung undertook his first assignment on December 30, 1941, to kill Prime Minister Winston Churchill on his way to Washington, D.C. but is stopped by the hero Steel.

On March 4, 1942, Kung is hired by the mysterious Prince Daka to team up with Tsunami and Sumo the Samurai, to infiltrate the All-Star Squadron's headquarters and steal Starman's gravity rod. This theft is thwarted by the Guardian and Kung escapes with Prince Daka.

In 1943, Kung is assigned to kill General Douglas MacArthur in Washington, D.C. Wonder Woman foils the assassination attempt, but Kung escapes to his sister's home in New York's Chinatown. Kung tries again to assassinate MacArthur at the Brooklyn Navy Yard, but is himself apparently killed while saving his sister from the weight of a teetering battleship whose drydock supports had been washed away.

Sometime prior to his death, Kung is brought aboard the Monitor's satellite by Harbinger as part of a combined effort to save the remaining Earths from the Anti-Monitor. He is later recruited by Brainiac as part of his massive supervillain army to conquer those remaining Earths.

After the effects of Crisis on Infinite Earths, Kung's history was incorporated into the combined Earth that was formed, with some details having changed. Chief among those changes were that the Wonder Woman that Kung fought during World War II was now a time-tossed Hippolyta and not Diana. 

It is assumed that he survived his supposed death while saving his sister, because his true death was revealed in Justice Society of America #27 and 28 (July and August 2009). It was revealed that he had made a deal with the U.S. Army in 1945 to convince Hirohito, Emperor of Japan, to surrender. However, the deadline for the surrender ran out and Hiroshima was bombed. Kung was onsite and died in the explosion. His spirit returned to plague the modern day Justice Society of America in these issues.

A chronologically younger Kung is seen in DC's Guns of the Dragon miniseries, taking place in 1927.

Kung II
A second unidentified Kung (be it a descendant or an unrelated person) debuted in Wonder Woman (vol. 3) Annual #1 (2007) as a previously unrevealed foe of Wonder Woman.

Powers and abilities
Kung had the ability to transform himself into animal forms through concentration. Among the animals he transformed into were a man-sized insect, a tiger, and a rhinoceros. Kung was able to retain his human intelligence when transformed but reverted to his human form if he somehow lost his concentration. As a samurai, he was also a master of several Japanese martial arts.

See also
 List of Wonder Woman enemies

Bibliography
 Wonder Woman #237-238 (November–December 1977)
 All-Star Squadron #8 (April 1982), #42-43 (February–March 1985)
 Crisis on Infinite Earths #5 (August 1985), #9 (December 1985)
 Who's Who #13 (March 1986)
 Wonder Woman (vol. 3) Annual #1 (2007)
 Justice Society of America (vol. 2) #27-28 (July–August 2009)

References

Articles about multiple fictional characters
Characters created by Gerry Conway
Comics characters introduced in 1977
DC Comics characters who are shapeshifters
DC Comics male supervillains
DC Comics martial artists
DC Comics metahumans
Earth-Two
Fictional Japanese American people
Fictional therianthropes